The Nokia E71 is a smartphone introduced in May 2008 from the Eseries range with a QWERTY keyboard targeting business users worldwide. It runs on Symbian OS v9.2, with a Series 60 3rd Edition, second generation Feature Pack 1. The Nokia E71 succeeded the Nokia E61/61i models, building on the base design and form factor but enhancing on the feature set.

The Nokia E71 was well received and highly popular, often considered to be one of Nokia's finest devices. It was superseded by the Nokia E72 in 2009.

Features

Key features 

 Optimized mobile email and messaging experience with full QWERTY keyboard and pocket-size for one-handed typing
 Two customizable Home Screen views with active stand-by plug-ins and application shortcuts – fast and easy switching between e.g. business and personal modes
 Quick access to applications with One-touch keys (Home, Calendar, Contacts, Email)
 Intelligent input with auto-completion, autocorrection and learning capability ensuring fast and error-free typing
 Nokia Calendar and Contacts for Eseries applications with improved features
 Built-in grade A-GPS and free Nokia Maps
 VOIP/ SIP Calling (Internet calls through Wi-Fi and 3G (if supported by the carrier))
 HSDPA data connection up to 3.6 Mbit/s for fast web browsing and downloading additional features
 3.2-megapixel camera with auto-focus and flash, self-portrait mirror and a front camera for video calls
 Music player, Media player, Visual Radio, Music Store(Internet Connectivity is required)
 Nokia MiniMap browser
 Online sharing: Share on Ovi
 Built-in mobile VPN for convenient intranet access
 Data encryption for both phone memory and microSD
 Nokia PC Internet access (via Phone as modem)

Technical profile 
 System: GSM/EGSM 850/900/1800/1900 (quad band), WCDMA 900/2100 (E71-1 version), WCDMA 850/1900 (E71-2 version), WCDMA 850/2100 (E71-3 version) and HSDPA class 6, maximum speed 3.6 Mbit/s/384 kbit/s (DL/UL)
 User Interface: S60 platform 3rd Edition (Feature Pack 1 based on Symbian OS v9.2)
 Dimensions: 114 × 57 × 10 mm (L × W × H)
 Standby time: Up to 17 days (GSM), 20 days (WCDMA)
 Talk time: Up to 10.5 hours (GSM), 4.5 hours (WCDMA)
 Main display: 2.36” QVGA (320x240), up to 16 million colors
 Battery: BP-4L, 1500 mAh, Li-Po
 Memory: Up to 110 MB internal memory, support for up to 32 GB microSD-HC memory card

Main camera 

Primary: 3.15 MP, 2048x1536 pixels, autofocus, LED flash
Video: QVGA@15fps
Secondary: Videocall camera

Data services and connectivity 

 WCDMA max download 384 kbit/s; upload 384 kbit/s
 HSDPA up to 3.6 Mbit/s
 WLAN (IEEE 802.11b/g)
 EGPRS multislot class 32, max download 296 kbit/s; upload 177.6 kbit/s
 GPS and support for assisted GPS (A-GPS)
 FS-USB, Infrared
 Bluetooth wireless technology 2.0 with A2DP stereo audio, enhanced data rates (EDR)
 2.5 mm AV connector

Software utilities 
Pre-installed:
 Nokia Messaging (SMS/MMS) and Nokia Mail for Exchange (MfE) for push email
 Image, video, track and sound clip Media Gallery
 Nokia Ovi Map
 GPS: Navigation, Position, Trip distance
 WLAN wizard
 Many other utilities

Several open source developers as well as paid third party developers have created software for various functions and utilities.

Nokia original accessories 
Car:
 Mobile Holder CR-106
 Advanced Car Kit CK-300
 Holder Easy Mount HH-12

Headsets: 
 Bluetooth Headset BH-602
 Audio: Bluetooth Speakers MD-5W
 Data: 8 GB Card MU-43

Power: 
 Mobile Charger DC-4

Colors: Grey steel, White, Red and black

Mainland China E71 (RM-493) differences
The E71 currently being sold in mainland China does not have Wi-Fi 802.11b/g WLAN networking or a back mounted camera. 3G was also excluded, because licenses for 3G in mainland China were only approved  in early 2009.

There is no reduction in price for phones lacking these features and a firmware update will not bring them back because the hardware itself is missing. The E71 sold in Macau and Hong Kong do not lack these features. The software bundled with the Chinese version is slightly different, as it also has a QQ client, along with some other Chinese specific programs.

Reception
The E71 received highly positive critical reception. It was widely praised for its battery life, software features like push email, slim design and hardware including keyboard. A Trusted Reviews reviewer gave it 5 stars out of 5. CNET UK wrote: "While we don't like the camera, we think the rest is pretty close to perfect". TechRadar called it a "terrific" device in a "well thought out package", listing the lack of a 3.5 mm headphone jack as the only disadvantage.

Some publications dubbed it a "BlackBerry killer" or "iPhone killer".

Awards
 Editors' Choice, Readers' Choice and 8.9 out of 10 rating on CNET.co.uk (as of June 2008)
 Phone of the Year and the Best Smartphone at the 2008 Mobile Choice Consumer Awards
 Wired Magazine's 2008 Best of Test
 Highly Commended in a category of Best Mobile Handset or Device at the GSMA Awards 2009

Firmware history
 100.07.81/100.07.76: Default firmware upon release
 110.07.127: Released 9 October 2008 (removed gmail support from mail app)
 200.21.118: Released 27 November 2008
 210.21.006: Released 17 March 2009
 300.21.012: Released 2 July 2009
 400.21.013: Released 28 November 2009
301.21.1 (RM-357 Only)
400.21.11 (RM-493; China Version, No 3G and Wi-Fi)
410.21.010: Released 8 February 2010
500.21.009: Released 6 June 2010
501.21.001: Released 12 December 2010 (users complain about bugs and battery drain)
510.21.009: Released 19 March 2011 (even more complaints about bugs)

Gallery

See also 
 Nokia Eseries
 List of Nokia products

References

External links 

 Nokia E71 Full Phone Specification
 Forum Nokia E71 technical device details
 CNET Asia review
 GSM Arena review
 MobileBurn review
 Trusted Reviews review
 Stress test of the cell phone Nokia E71

Mobile phones introduced in 2008
Mobile phones with an integrated hardware keyboard
Nokia ESeries
Mobile phones with user-replaceable battery
Mobile phones with infrared transmitter